Drisheen is a type of blood pudding made in Ireland. It is distinguished from other forms of Irish black pudding by having a gelatinous consistency.  It is made from a mixture of cow's, pig's or sheep's blood, milk, salt and fat, which is boiled and sieved and finally cooked using the main intestine of an animal (typically a pig or sheep) as the sausage skin. The sausage may be flavoured with herbs, such as tansy, or served with tansy sauce. The recipe for drisheen varies widely from place to place and it also differs depending on the time of year. Drisheen is a cooked product but it usually requires further preparation before eating. How this is done varies widely from place to place.

In the Irish cities of Cork and Limerick, the dish is often paired with tripe, where it is known as "packet and tripe". In Limerick the combination of tripe and drisheen is considered a meal particular to and strongly associated with Limerick.

In culture
Drisheen is mentioned in James Joyce's Ulysses, Finnegans Wake and A Portrait of the Artist as a Young Man. It is also described in  celebrated travel writer H. V. Morton's 1930 book, In Search of Ireland.

See also

 Offal
 Blood sausage
 List of Irish dishes
 List of sausages

References

External links

 A modern recipe 
 Cork Slang
 Recipe for Packet and Tripe 

Irish cuisine
Savory puddings
Blood sausages
Irish meat dishes